The acronym BIHS may stand for:

Schools 
Bishop Ireton High School
Bronx International High School
Busan International High School

Other organisations 
Banco Itau Holding Financeira, S.A
British Ice Hockey Superleague
Beech Island Historical Society
Block Island Historical Society
Blennerhassett Island Historical State Park
Brierfield Ironworks Historical State Park